Benjamin Bostrom (born May 7, 1974) is an American former professional motorcycle racer. From 1995 to 2011 he competed in the AMA Superbike Championship, the World Superbike Championship and the MotoGP world championship..

Motorcycle racing career
The son of Dave Bostrom and nephew of Paul Bostrom, both successful dirt track racers, Bostrom began his motorcycle racing career in the same fashion by winning the American Motorcyclist Association (AMA) 600 Dirt Track  National Championship in 1993. He switched to road racing in 1995.

Bostrom captured the AMA Superbike national championship as a Honda rider in 1998, without winning a race. A year later Bostrom, astride a Ducati and still racing full-time in the AMA series, won a Laguna Seca Raceway World Superbike race (and finished second in another) as a wild card entry.

Bostrom first raced full-time in the Superbike World Championship in 2000 on a factory Ducati.  In 2001 he won an unexpected 6 races, including 5 in a row on a factory L&M Ducati, to finish third overall. Bostrom did not win a race in 2002, and scored weaker results as the season progressed.

For 2003 Bostrom returned to the domestic series for American Honda on an RC51, staying there in 2004 on the brand new Honda Fireblade CBR1000RR. He finished 4th in AMA Superbike in both years. He made a return to international racing for 2005, with the Renegade Honda team in the World Superbike Championship, but was not successful. He qualified slowest of the 28 international entries in Qatar at the first round, but scored a few top ten finishes during the season to come 14th overall.

Bostrom returned to Ducati as Neil Hodgson's teammate for the 2006 AMA Superbike Championship. Ducati withdrew from the AMA Superbike Championship at the end of 2006, leaving Bostrom to join the Yamaha/Graves Motorsports team in 2007 for a rebuilding year, riding in the AMA Superstock Championship, where he finished second in points, though unable to score a win.

In 2008, Ben Bostrom switched from Superstock to Supersport and led the Graves Motorsports Yamaha team to an AMA championship in the 600cc class.  At Virginia International Raceway that year,  Bostrom finished 2nd and gave his trophy to Sam Koup (the Grandson of racer Larry Koup), and distributed his champagne bottle and hats to others.  Bostrom went on to win the 2008 Supersport Championship for under the Graves Motorsports banner.  This was the last year of the AMA series before ownership transferred to the Daytona Motorsports Group, and the 600cc class was renamed AMA Daytona Sportbike.

For 2009, Bostrom raced a 1000cc Yamaha YZF-R1 in the American Superbike class.  He also moonlighted in select 600cc events, including the season opener, Daytona 200, in which he took 1st place.

In addition to Superbike, Bostrom races Supermoto- a multi-discipline format involving off-road, flat track and road-racing in one event.  Bostrom won the 2003 AMA Supermoto Championship  and the gold medal at the inaugural X-Games Supermoto competition. The X-Games race (whose field included European Supermoto Champion Eddy Seel and seven-time Supercross champ, Jeremy McGrath) saw Bostrom win after nearly tipping over five laps from the finish. Ben also dabbles in journalism with an article entitled "Boz Bros Chronicles" which is featured in 2Wheel Tuner Magazine each month as well as Sportbikeclub.com.

In 2014 Bostrom was part of a winning team in the Race Across America, cycling alongside Dave Mirra, Micky Dymond and Dave Zabriskie.

His brother, Eric Bostrom, is also a professional motorcycle racer.

Career statistics

Grand Prix motorcycle racing

By season

By class

Races by year
(key) (Races in bold indicate pole position; races in italics indicate fastest lap)

AMA Pro Racing

References

External links
BozBros.com - Official Bostrom Brothers site
www.gravesport.com - Official Graves Motorsports site

1974 births
Living people
American motorcycle racers
Superbike World Championship riders
AMA Superbike Championship riders
AMA Supersport Championship riders
LCR Team MotoGP riders
MotoGP World Championship riders